Varėnai (formerly) is a village in Kėdainiai district municipality, in Kaunas County, in central Lithuania. It is located in southwestern suburbian area of the Kėdainiai city, by the Klamputis rivulet. According to the 2011 census, the village has a population of 5 people.

Demography

Gallery

References

Villages in Kaunas County
Kėdainiai District Municipality